Natascha Liebknecht (born 16 January 1941) is a German speed skater. She competed in two events at the 1960 Winter Olympics.

References

1941 births
Living people
German female speed skaters
Olympic speed skaters of the United Team of Germany
Speed skaters at the 1960 Winter Olympics
People from Pushkino